Parinam may refer to:

 Parinam (1961 film), a 1961 Indian film
 Parinam (2005 film), a 2005 Bengali film